Gilles Talmant (born 27 April 1970) is a French former professional racing cyclist. He rode in three editions of the Tour de France.

References

External links

1970 births
Living people
French male cyclists
Cyclists from Paris